"Won't Be Late" is a song by American singer and rapper Swae Lee featuring Canadian rapper Drake, released as a single by EarDrummers Records on August 16, 2019. It was produced by Tekno with additional production by Mike Will Made It, and released alongside Swae Lee's solo track "Sextasy".

Critical reception
Rolling Stone wrote that the song's "island and house-flavored grooves servpe as an undercurrent to [Swae Lee and Drake's] rhymes, which discuss the merits of taking it slow in a relationship". XXL described the song as a "banger" and a "dance track" with an "island bop" featuring Swae Lee's "croons" and Drake rhyming about a "complicated relationship".

Personnel
Credits adapted from Tidal.

 Swae Lee – main vocalist, writing
 Drake – vocalist, writing
 Tekno – production, writing
 Mike Will Made It – additional production, writing
 Noel Cadastre – recording
 40 OVO – mixing
 Chris Athens – mastering

Charts

Release history

References

2019 singles
2019 songs
Swae Lee songs
Drake (musician) songs
Songs written by Swae Lee
Songs written by Drake (musician)
Songs written by Mike Will Made It
Song recordings produced by Mike Will Made It